The Vix Note or Vyx Note ( or ) was a communication note sent by  (or Vyx), a French lieutenant colonel and delegate of the Entente, to the government of Mihály Károlyi of the First Hungarian Republic of the alliance's intention to make Hungary evacuate and withdraw from more territory than agreed in the Armistice of Belgrade. The note ultimately contributed to the downfall of the First Republic and the establishment of the Hungarian Soviet Republic, and it is credited with being the phenomenon that put an end to Hungarian rule over the region of Transylvania.

See also
 Treaty of Trianon

References

1910s in Hungary
Aftermath of World War I in Hungary
20th century in Transylvania